The 2003–04 ABA Goodyear League was the third season of the Liga ABA.  The league expanded this season: 14 teams from Bosnia and Herzegovina, Croatia, Serbia and Montenegro, and Slovenia participated in Goodyear League in its third season: Union Olimpija, Krka, Pivovarna Laško, Geoplin Slovan, Cibona VIP, Zadar, Zagreb, Split Croatia Osiguranje, Široki Hercegtisak, Banjalučka pivara, Crvena zvezda, Reflex, Budućnost, Lovćen CG komercijalna banka.

There were 26 rounds played in the regular part of the season, best four teams qualified for the Final Four Tournament which was played in Zagreb from April 16 until April 18, 2004.

Reflex became the 2004 Goodyear League Champion.

Regular season

Final four
Matches played at Dražen Petrović Basketball Hall, Zagreb

Incident
On Friday night, 16 April 2004 around 11pm following the semifinal games, an ethnically motivated incident occurred when Crvena zvezda's director Igor Žeželj and B92 journalist Danijel Bukumirović got assaulted at the Panorama Hotel parking lot by an organized group of fifteen Croatian hooligans with chains, rocks and metal poles. Bukumirović managed to escape into the car with only minor injuries while Žeželj wasn't as lucky and ended up with a fractured rib and 6 stitches on his forehead. Croatian police reportedly arrested six individuals in connection with the attack that was carried out by a group that trolled around the Final Four venue Dražen Petrović Basketball Hall, as well as hotels Sheraton and Panorama looking to beat up anyone from Serbia.

Stats leaders

Ranking MVP

Points

Rebounds

Assists
{| class="wikitable" style="text-align: center;"
|-
!Rank
!width="175"|Name
!width="120"|Team
!width="60"|Assists
!width="60"|Games
!width="60"|APG
|-
|1.||align="left"| Curtis McCants||align="left"| Split CO||73||16||4.56
|-
|1.||align="left"| Igor Rakočević||align="left"| Crvena zvezda||101||23||4.39
|-
|3.||align="left"| Vladimir Krstić||align="left"| Zadar||60||14||4.29
|-
|4.||align="left"| Martin Vanjak||align="left"| Široki Hercegtisak||109||26||4.19
|-
|5.||align="left"| Ivan Tomas||align="left"| Zagreb||99||26||3.96
|-

References

2003–04
2003–04 in European basketball leagues
2003–04 in Serbian basketball
2003–04 in Slovenian basketball
2003–04 in Croatian basketball
2003–04 in Bosnia and Herzegovina basketball